Bagodar-Saria subdivision is an administrative subdivision of the Giridih district in the state of Jharkhand, India.

Subdivisions
Giridih district is divided into the following administrative subdivisions:

Police stations
Police stations in Bagodar-Saria subdivision have the following features and jurisdiction:

Blocks
Community development blocks in Bagodar-Saria subdivision are:

Education
Given in the table below (data in numbers) is a comprehensive picture of the education scenario in Giridih district, with data for the year 2013-14:

Educational institutions
The following institutions are located in Bagodar-Saria subdivision:
Sariya College was established at Suriya in 1984. It is affiliated with Vinoba Bhave University and offers courses in arts and commerce.
Ram Krishna Vivekananda College of Education was established at Bagodar in 2009. Affiliated to Vinoba Bhave University, it offers courses in arts, science, commerce and education.

References

Sub-divisions in Giridih district